María Victoria Morera Villuendas, also known as Matoya Morera to diplomatic colleagues, (25 May 1956 – 5 August 2020) was a Spanish career diplomat. In 2003, Morera was appointed Undersecretary of the Ministry of Foreign Affairs, becoming the first woman to hold that position.

Biography
Morera was born in Madrid in 1956. She entered Spain's Diplomatic Service in 1982 and held a variety of diplomatic postings over the course of the next two decades.

The then-Minister of Foreign Affairs Ana Palacio appointed Morera as Director of her the ministry's Cabinet in July 2002. In May 2003, Morera was appointed Undersecretary of the Ministry of Foreign Affairs, becoming the first woman to hold that particular position. She remained in that post until April 2004, when she was replaced by the new incoming Foreign Minister, Miguel Ángel Moratinos.

Shortly after leaving her role as Undersecretary, María Victoria Morera was appointed Ambassador to Belgium. She served as the Spanish ambassador in Brussels from 2004 until 2007. In 2008, she became director of the Consular Emergency Unit, which helps Spanish citizens in trouble abroad. She held this role for several years. 

From 2012 until January 2017, Morera was appointed the Director General of Bilateral Relations with Countries of the European Union, Candidate Countries and Countries of the European Economic Area within the foreign ministry.

In January 2017, Morera was appointed , which is considered one of Spain's most important ambassadorships. Morera was also the first woman to serve as Ambassador to Germany. She served in the posting until October 2018, when the new government of Prime Minister Pedro Sánchez appointed  as her replacement in a diplomatic reshuffle.

Morera was diagnosed with cancer while still serving as Ambassador to Germany. She continued to work in the Foreign Ministry's General Services Inspectorate upon her return to Spain.

María Victoria Morera died from cancer in Madrid on 5 August 2020, at the age of 64.

References

1956 births
2020 deaths
Spanish women ambassadors
Ambassadors of Spain to Belgium
Ambassadors of Spain to Germany
Dames Grand Cross of the Order of Isabella the Catholic
People from Madrid